is an interactive movie video game developed by Data East featuring animation by Toei Animation, originally released exclusively in Japan as a laserdisc-based arcade game in 1985. The player assumes the role of a vigilante who must avenge the death of his wife by pursuing the biker gang responsible for her death in a modified sports car. The game would later be ported to a variety of home formats such as the MSX and Sharp X1 (VHD format), Sega CD (under the title of Road Blaster FX), LaserActive (in Mega-LD format), PlayStation and Sega Saturn (in a compilation with Thunder Storm). The Sega CD and Mega-LD versions were released outside of Japan under titles of Road Avenger and Road Prosecutor respectively.

Gameplay
As with other laserdisc-based arcade games from the same time, the gameplay consists of on-screen instructions overlaid over pre-recorded full motion video animated footage of high-speed chases and vehicular combat. The player controls the crosshair to steer their car toward the correct directions according to the green arrows flashing and beeping beside it, while controlling the gas pedal, brake and booster whenever they light up.

The game has nine stages. Upon successfully completing a level, the player is graded on the reaction time. Different difficulty levels can be selected. In Normal Mode, pop-up icons and audio tones signal when to turn left or right, brake, hit turbo, or hit other cars. In Hard Mode, there are no on-screen icons to guide the player.

Plot
The story of Road Blaster is inspired by revenge thriller films such as Mad Max. In the late 1990s United States, the player assumes the role of a vigilante who drives a customized sports car in order to get revenge on a biker gang responsible for his wife's death on their honeymoon. After recovering from his own injuries, he upgrades his car and goes on a rampage through nine areas. His goal is to seek out the gang's female boss and complete his vengeance.

Development
Road Blaster uses animation provided by the anime studio Toei Animation. It was animated under the guidance of Yoshinobu Inano, who also directed or key-animated such films such as Gundam: Char's Counter Attack, Macross: Do You Remember Love?, and The Transformers: The Movie. It was animated using 15,000 hand-painted cels to produce over 30 minutes of animation. Game director Yoshihisa Kishimoto, who previously worked on Cobra Command, later directed the arcade version of Double Dragon, where the car from Road Blaster can be seen inside the Lee brothers' garage at the start of the game.

The chopper from Cobra Command/Thunder Storm can also be seen at the beginning of Road Blaster.

Releases
Road Blaster was originally released in 1985 as a laserdisc-based arcade game. Various ports were released throughout history, including versions for the MSX, X1 (both in VHD format), Mega CD/Sega CD, LaserActive (in Mega LD format), Sega Saturn, PlayStation, and 3DO Interactive Multiplayer (prototyped as Turbo Blaster). However, only the Sega CD and Mega LD versions were released outside Japan, under the titles Road Avenger and Road Prosecutor, respectively. The titles were possibly changed to avoid confusion with the similarly titled arcade game RoadBlasters by Atari Games, which was ported to the Mega Drive around the same time. Road Blaster was also released for the Sharp X68000 and for Windows in 2011, exclusively in Japan. Cobra Command and Road Blaster were ported to iOS by Revolutionary Concepts in 2010 and 2011, respectively. In 2018, a port for the Amiga (OCS and AGA) and the CD32 was also released unofficially.

Other variations included one-shot reproductions for VHS cassette players such as Takara's Video Challenger which was a limited interactive port of the Road Blaster arcade game. The Sega Saturn and PlayStation ports were compilations of Road Blaster and another laserdisc arcade game developed by the same team titled Thunder Storm (known outside Japan as Cobra Command).

Reception

In Japan, Game Machine listed Road Blaster on their January 15, 1986 issue as being the fourteenth most-successful upright/cockpit arcade unit of the month.

Dragon reviewers gave the Sega CD version of the game 4 out of 5 stars in 1993. GameFan noted it has greater interaction compared to Time Gal and Thunderstorm, and praised the "non-stop control of the vehicle," graphics, smooth animation, and "andrenaline rush" experience. GamePro praised the highly detailed animation and stereo CD sound, and called it a "masterpiece" that is "like participating in an intense, action-packed, animated movie."

On release, Famicom Tsūshin scored the Sega Saturn version a 25 out of 40, and the PlayStation version a 23 out of 40. Famitsu would later give the Mega CD version a score of 32 out of 40, while MEGA rated it at 86%. The iOS port was released to generally favourable reviews, including the scores of 8 out of 10 from IGN and 7 out of 10 from Pocket Gamer.

Legacy
A novelization of the game was announced in 2009. The project was officially authorized by G-Mode of Japan (the rights holder to most of Data East's catalog) to be written by Mary Margaret Park.

References

External links
 
 Road Blaster at Arcade-History
 Road Blaster at Dragon's Lair Project
 MSX version at Generation MSX

1985 video games
3DO Interactive Multiplayer games
Arcade video games
Data East video games
Full motion video based games
Interactive movie video games
IOS games
LaserDisc video games
MSX games
MSX2 games
Sega CD games
Sega Saturn games
Science fiction video games
PlayStation (console) games
Post-apocalyptic video games
X68000 games
Sharp X1 games
Telenet Japan games
Video games about police officers
Video games about revenge
Video games developed in Japan
Video games set in the 1990s
Video games set in the United States
Windows games
Toei Animation video game projects
Data East arcade games